West Woodstock is an unincorporated village and census-designated place (CDP) in the town of Woodstock, Windsor County, Vermont, United States. As of the 2020 census, it had a population of 401.

The CDP is in central Windsor County, at the geographic center of the town of Woodstock, in the valley of the Ottauquechee River, an east-flowing tributary of the Connecticut River. U.S. Route 4 is the main street through the community, leading northeast  to the village of Woodstock and west  to Bridgewater.

The West Woodstock Bridge, a historic steel bridge, carries Mill Road across the Ottauquechee River from the center of the village. The Lincoln Covered Bridge crosses the Ottauquechee at the western end of the CDP, connecting Route 4 with Bridges Road and Fletcher Hill road.

References 

Populated places in Windsor County, Vermont
Census-designated places in Windsor County, Vermont
Census-designated places in Vermont